TCDD HSL700 is a series of electro-diesel locomotives used by the Turkish State Railways, built by Tülomsaş.  The units have Bo'Bo' wheel arrangement and are powered by 300 kW engine and/or 400kW Li-Ion batteries.

References

Bo-Bo locomotives
Tülomsaş locomotives
HSL700
Standard gauge locomotives of Turkey
Railway locomotives introduced in 2018